Lee Patrick Concepcion (born November 17, 1967) is a Filipino swimmer who has participated at the Summer Olympic Games.

Education
Concepcion graduated from his elementary studies at La Salle Greenhills. He studied at the high school department of the same school as a prep freshman before moving to Serra High School in San Mateo, California in the United States in 1982. For his collegiate studies, he attended the University of California-Berkeley where he attained a degree in political science in 1990. In 2004, he earned a master's degree in leadership ministry at the Victory Leadership Institute in Global City.

Swimming career
Concepcion's mother taught him how to swim when he was five. His first tournament was a novice meet at the Rizal Memorial Sports Complex in October 1975 where he finished first, second, and third in three separate events. He began to pursue to participate at the Olympics after watching the 1976 Summer Olympics and was encouraged by his father. He began to finish well in ASEAN age group competitions in 1978. He finished fourth in the 10-and-under 50 meter breaststroke in that year.

Concepcion held the national record in the 200-meter breaststroke from 1988 to 2004. He participated at the 1985 Southeast Asian Games and 1991 edition where he garnered medals. He participated at the  100-meter and 200-meter breaststroke events at the 1988 Summer Olympics and at the 100-meter and 200-meter breaststroke and the 4x100 medley relay events at the 1992 edition of the Games.

Post-retirement
He has been a pastor of Victory since 2002. Concepcion served as pastor of Victory Ortigas, Victory Greenhills, and at Victory Pioneer.

References

1967 births
Living people
Filipino male swimmers
Swimmers at the 1988 Summer Olympics
Swimmers at the 1992 Summer Olympics
Olympic swimmers of the Philippines
Southeast Asian Games medalists in swimming
Southeast Asian Games gold medalists for the Philippines
Southeast Asian Games competitors for the Philippines
Southeast Asian Games bronze medalists for the Philippines
Competitors at the 1987 Southeast Asian Games
Competitors at the 1991 Southeast Asian Games
Competitors at the 1993 Southeast Asian Games